The black swamp snake (Liodytes pygaea) is a species of snake in the subfamily Natricinae of the family Colubridae. The species is endemic to the southeastern United States. There are three subspecies, including the nominotypical subspecies.

Common names
Additional common names for L. pygaea include black swampsnake, mud snake, red-bellied mud snake, and swamp snake.

Subspecies
The following three subspecies are recognized as being valid.
South Florida swamp snake, Liodytes pygaea cyclas 
Carolina swamp snake, Liodytes pygaea paludis 
North Florida swamp snake, Liodytes pygaea pygaea 

Nota bene: A trinomial authority in parentheses indicates that the subspecies was originally described in a genus other than Liodytes.

Geographic range
L. pygaea is found in the states of North Carolina, South Carolina, Georgia, Alabama, and Florida on the east coast of the United States.

Habitat
L. pygaea prefers swampland habitat that is heavily vegetated.

Description
It is uniformly black on the dorsum, with a bright orange or red belly.

Behavior
The black swamp snake is almost entirely aquatic. It spends most of its time hiding among dense vegetation in tannic cypress swamps.

Diet
L. pygaea feeds on small fish, tadpoles, frogs, salamanders, sirens, amphiumas, and invertebrates, such as leeches and earthworms.

Reproduction
The black swamp snake is ovoviviparous, giving birth to live young directly in shallow water. Unlike many snakes, females feed actively while gravid, suggesting that they may pass nutrients directly on to the young. Broods of 11 to 13 have been observed. Newborns are 11–14 cm (4¼-5⅜ in) long (including tail).

References

External links
Florida Museum of Natural History: Online Guide to the Snakes of Florida.
"Black Snakes": Identification and Ecology - University of Florida fact sheet.

Further reading
Behler JL, King FW (1979). The Audubon Society Field Guide to North American Reptiles and Amphibians. New York: Alfred A. Knopf. 743 pp., 657 color plates. . (Seminatrix pygaea, pp. 652–653 + Plates 487, 494).
Boulenger GA (1893). Catalogue of the Snakes in the British Museum (Natural History). Volume I., Containing the Families ... Colubridæ Aglyphæ, part. London: Trustees of the British Museum (Natural History). (Taylor and Francis, printers). xiii + 448 pp. + Plates I-XXVIII. (Tropidonotus pygæus, new combination, p. 228).
Conant R, Bridges W (1939). What Snake Is That? A Field Guide to the Snakes of the United States East of the Rocky Mountains. (With 108 drawings by Edmond Malnate). New York and London: D. Appleton-Century Company. Frontispiece map + viii + 163 pp. + Plates A-C, 32. (Seminatrix pygaea, pp. 107–108 + Plate 20, figure 59).
Cope ED (1871). "Ninth Contribution to the Herpetology of Tropical America". Proceedings of the Academy of Natural Sciences of Philadelphia 23: 200–224. (Contia pygæa, new species, pp. 223–224).
Dowling, Herndon G. (1950). "Studies of the black swamp snake, Seminatrix pygaea (Cope), with descriptions of two new subspecies". Miscellaneous Publications, Museum of Zoology, University of Michigan (76): 1-38. (Seminatrix pygaea cyclas, new subspecies, pp. 14–17; S. p. paludis, new subspecies, pp. 12–14).
McVay, John David; Carstens, Bryan (2013). "Testing monophyly without well-supported gene trees: Evidence from multi-locus nuclear data conflicts with existing taxonomy in the snake tribe Thamnophiini". Molecular Phylogenetics and Evolution 68 (3): 425–431. (Liodytes pygaea, new combination).
Powell R, Conant R, Collins JT (2016). Peterson Field Guide to Reptiles and Amphibians of Eastern and Central North America, Fourth Edition. Boston and New York: Houghton Mifflin Harcourt. xiv + 494 pp., 47 plates, 207 figures. . (Liodytes pygaea, pp. 413–414 + Plate 42).
Smith HM, Brodie ED Jr (1982). Reptiles of North America: A Guide to Field Identification. New York: Golden Press. 240 pp.  (paperback),  (hardcover). (Seminatrix pygaea, pp. 158–159).
Stejneger L, Barbour T (1917). A Check List of North American Amphibians and Reptiles. Cambridge, Massachusetts: Harvard University Press. 125 pp. (Seminatrix pygaea, p. 97).
Wright AH, Wright AA (1957). Handbook of Snakes of the United States and Canada. Ithaca and London: Comstock Publishing Associates, a Division of Cornell University Press. 1,105 pp. (in two volumes). (Seminatrix pygaea, pp. 662–669, Figures 194–195, Map 50).
Zim HS, Smith HM (1956). Reptiles and Amphibians: A Guide to Familiar American Species: A Golden Nature Guide. Revised Edition. New York: Simon and Schuster. 160 pp. (Seminatrix pygaea, pp. 79–80, 156).

Liodytes
Reptiles of the United States
Taxa named by Edward Drinker Cope